Bavet is the largest city in Svay Rieng Province, Cambodia. It is an international border gate between Cambodia and Vietnam. Its counterpart across the border is Moc Bai, Vietnam.

Bavet belongs to one of the poorest provinces of Cambodia. Actually, its only economic resource is its position on NH1, on the straight way between Ho Chi Minh City and Phnom Penh.

Bavet is one of the "special economic zones" (SEZ) of Cambodia and there were established textile industries and bicycles factories. However the most evident economic activity of Bavet are the casinos and cockfighting rings, attended by Vietnamese.

In accordance with decentralization politics experienced by Cambodian government, Bavet commune has become a municipality by sub-decree in December 2008. There are about 10–12 (from small to large) casinos and 6 to 7 developing areas set up by foreign investors. The city is in a growing state. The 2 km-long Neak Loeang bridge funded by Japan has been finished in April, 2015. It is the longest bridge in Cambodia.

Transport

The proposed Ho Chi Minh City–Phnom Penh railway is planned to pass through Bavet.

Gallery

References

Populated places in Svay Rieng province
Cambodia–Vietnam border crossings
Cities in Cambodia